Imre Nagy (21 February 1933 – 20 October 2013) was a Hungarian modern pentathlete and Olympic champion. He participated on the Hungarian team that won the gold medals at the 1960 Summer Olympics in Rome, and he also received an individual silver medal at the event. He received a bronze medal with the Hungarian team at the 1964 Summer Olympics in Tokyo.

References

External links

Hungarian male modern pentathletes
Olympic modern pentathletes of Hungary
Modern pentathletes at the 1960 Summer Olympics
Modern pentathletes at the 1964 Summer Olympics
Olympic gold medalists for Hungary
Olympic silver medalists for Hungary
Olympic bronze medalists for Hungary
Olympic medalists in modern pentathlon
1933 births
2013 deaths
World Modern Pentathlon Championships medalists
Medalists at the 1964 Summer Olympics
Medalists at the 1960 Summer Olympics
People from Monor
Sportspeople from Pest County
20th-century Hungarian people
21st-century Hungarian people